Copper is a reddish brown color that resembles the metal copper.

The first recorded use of copper as a color name in English was in 1594.

Variations of copper

Pale copper

At right is displayed pale tone of copper that is called copper in Crayola crayons.  This color was formulated by Crayola in 1903.

Copper red

At right is displayed the color copper red.

The first recorded use of copper red as a color name in English was in 1590.

Copper penny

At right is displayed the color copper penny.

Copper penny is one of the colors in the special set of metallic Crayola crayons called Silver Swirls, the colors of which were formulated by Crayola in 1990.

Copper rose

At right is displayed the color copper rose.

The first recorded use of copper rose as a color name in English was in 1928.

Copper in nature 
Plants
The Copper-colored Restrepia is an orchid native to Colombia.

Snakes
Copperhead snakes (such as Trigonocephalus contortrix) are so named for the coloration found between their eyes.

Copper in culture 
Ethnography
 Indigenous peoples of the Americas are sometimes described as being copper colored or copper-skinned.

Heraldry
 Copper (heraldry) – Copper has been used in heraldry as a metal tincture since the late 20th Century, so far mostly in Canada.

Sports 
The Zambia national football team are nicknamed the Chipolopolo, which translates to "Copper Bullets" and typically features the color in its uniforms.

See also 
 List of colors

References 

Shades of brown
Copper